Shen Qihan (27 April 1922 – 27 November 2022) was a Chinese geologist, and an academician of the Chinese Academy of Sciences.

Biography
Shen was born in Huaiyin County (now Huaiyin District of Huai'an), Jiangsu, on 27 April 1922, while his ancestral home is in Haimen District of Nantong. During high school, his studies were interrupted by the Japanese War of Aggression Against China. In 1941, with the sponsorship of his elder cousin, he fled from Shanghai to Chongqing, where he was admitted to the Department of Geology, Chongqing University in the following year.

After graduating in April 1946, Shen became an intern and technician of Nanjing Central Geological Survey Institute, and moved to Nanjing Institute of Geology, Chinese Academy of Sciences in April 1949. He was an engineer of the Team 429, Hubei Daye Geological Department in January 1953 and subsequently Team 214, North China Geological Bureau in Yuanqu County, Shanxi. In October 1956, he was transferred to Beijing Department of Geology and the Ministry of Geology and Mineral Resources, where he successively worked as deputy chief engineer, researcher, director and doctoral supervisor of Geological Research Institute.

On 27 November 2022, Shen died in Beijing, at the age of 100.

Publications

Honours and awards
 1989 State Natural Science Award (Second Class) 
 1991 Member of the Chinese Academy of Sciences (CAS)

References

1922 births
2022 deaths
People from Huai'an
Scientists from Jiangsu
Chongqing University alumni
Members of the Chinese Academy of Sciences
Chinese centenarians
Men centenarians
20th-century Chinese geologists
21st-century Chinese geologists